Sergei Gennadievich Alifirenko (born 21 January 1959) is a Russian pistol shooter, originally from Armenia, specializing in the 25 m Rapid Fire Pistol event.

He was born in Kirovakan.

Career 
His greatest accomplishment is the gold medal from the 2000 Olympics. Since the rules for the event changed on 1 January 2005, Alifirenko has been most successful in his adaptation to them. He won both the European Championships and the World Cup Final in 2005, and has held several world records. After a bronze medal at the 2006 ISSF World Shooting Championships and a gold medal at the pre-Olympic World Cup competition in Beijing in April 2008, it was a setback for the Russian team when he had to withdraw from the Olympics due to eye illness.

Doping scandal 
In October 2008 Alifirenko was suspended for 2 years after he failed a drug test for dexamethasone doping.

References

External links
 Alifirenko's profile at ISSF NEWS

1959 births
Living people
Russian male sport shooters
ISSF pistol shooters
Olympic shooters of Russia
Shooters at the 2000 Summer Olympics
Shooters at the 2004 Summer Olympics
Olympic gold medalists for Russia
Olympic bronze medalists for Russia
People from Vanadzor
Olympic medalists in shooting
Medalists at the 2004 Summer Olympics
Doping cases in shooting
Russian sportspeople in doping cases
Medalists at the 2000 Summer Olympics